Melvyn James (21 February 1948 – 11 December 2022) was a Welsh rugby union and professional rugby league footballer who played in the 1960s, 1970s and 1980s.

Career

International honours
Mel James won caps for the Wales (RL) while at St. Helens in the 1975 Rugby League World Cup against England, in 1978 against France, England, and Australia, in 1979 against France and England, in 1980 against France and England, and in 1981 against France and England (2 matches). James also toured with the 1979 Great Britain side in Australia but did not play in any of  the test matches.

World Club Challenge Final appearances
Mel James was a Substitute in St. Helens 2-25 defeat by the 1975 NSWRFL season premiers, Eastern Suburbs Roosters in the unofficial 1976 World Club Challenge at Sydney Cricket Ground on Tuesday 29 June 1976.

Challenge Cup Final appearances
Mel James played as a substitute (replacing  John Mantle) in St. Helens' 20-5 victory over Widnes in the 1976 Challenge Cup Final at Wembley Stadium, London on Saturday 8 May 1976.

County Cup Final appearances
Mel James played left- in St. Helens 0-16 defeat by Warrington in the 1982 Lancashire Cup Final at Central Park, Wigan on Saturday 23 October 1982.

BBC2 Floodlit Trophy Final appearances
Mel James played right- in St. Helens' 22-2 victory over Dewsbury in the 1975 BBC2 Floodlit Trophy Final  at Knowsley Road, St. Helens on Tuesday 16 December 1975, played right- in the 11-26 defeat by Hull Kingston Rovers in the 1977 BBC2 Floodlit Trophy Final  at Craven Park, Kingston upon Hull on Tuesday 13 December 1977, and played right- in the 7-13 defeat by Widnes in the 1978 BBC2 Floodlit Trophy Final  at Knowsley Road, St Helens on Tuesday 12 December 1978.

Personal life
James died on 11 December 2022, at the age of 74.

References

External links
 Profile at saints.org.uk
 Statistics at swansearfc.co.uk

1948 births
2022 deaths
Resolven RFC players
Rugby league players from Resolven
Rugby league props
Rugby union players from Resolven
St Helens R.F.C. players
Swansea RFC players
Wales national rugby league team players
Welsh rugby league players
Welsh rugby union players